The Qingshui River is a tributary of the Wu River in Guizhou Province, China. It is interrupted by the Dahuashui Dam.

See also
 Other Qingshuis in China and on Taiwan

References

Rivers of Guizhou